EIA may refer to:

 English Ice Hockey Association
 European Industrial Hemp Association